Cesare Speciano or Cesare Speciani (1539–1607) was a Roman Catholic prelate who served as Apostolic Nuncio to Emperor (1592–1597), Bishop of Cremona (1591–1607), Apostolic Nuncio to Spain (1585–1588), and Bishop of Novara (1584–1591).

Biography
Cesare Speciano was born in Cremona, Italy on 1 Sep 1539 on ordained a priest in 1567.
On 28 November 1584, he was appointed during the papacy of Pope Gregory XIII as Bishop of Novara.
On 13 December 1584, he was consecrated bishop by Tolomeo Gallio, Cardinal-Priest of Sant'Agata de' Goti, with Giovanni D'Amato, Bishop Emeritus of Minori, and Paolo Odescalchi, Bishop Emeritus of Penne e Atri, serving as co-consecrators.
On 11 December 1585, he was appointed during the papacy of Pope Sixtus V as Apostolic Nuncio to Spain; he resigned from the position on 27 August 1588.
On 30 January 1591, he was appointed during the papacy of Pope Gregory XIV as Bishop of Cremona.
On 14 May 1592, he was appointed during the papacy of Pope Clement VIII as Apostolic Nuncio to Emperor; he resigned from the position (then known as Apostolic Nuncio to Germany) on 20 June 1597.
He served as Bishop of Cremona until his death on 21 August 1607 in Spoleto, Italy.

Episcopal succession
While bishop, he was the principal consecrator of:
José Anglés, Bishop of Bosa (1587);
Andrés Pacheco, Bishop of Segovia (1588);
Zbynék Berka z Dubé a Liepé, Archbishop of Prague (1593); and
Simon Feuerstein, Titular Bishop of Belline and Auxiliary Bishop of Brixen (1598).

References

External links and additional sources
 (for Chronology of Bishops) 
 (for Chronology of Bishops) 
 (for Chronology of Bishops) 
 (for Chronology of Bishops) 
 (for Chronology of Bishops) 
 (for Chronology of Bishops) 
 (for Chronology of Bishops) 

16th-century Italian Roman Catholic bishops
17th-century Italian Roman Catholic bishops
Bishops appointed by Pope Gregory XIII
Bishops appointed by Pope Sixtus V
Bishops appointed by Pope Gregory XIV
Bishops appointed by Pope Clement VIII
1539 births
1607 deaths
Apostolic Nuncios to the Holy Roman Empire
Apostolic Nuncios to Spain